or  is the highest mountain on the island of Senja in Troms og Finnmark county, Norway. It is located in Senja Municipality, southeast of the Mefjorden and southwest of the village of Mefjordbotn. The lake Svartholvatnet is located along the southwestern base of the mountain.

References

External links

Mountains of Troms og Finnmark
Senja